Perambra is a small town located in the Thrissur district of Kerala, South India. It is located on National Highway (NH) 544, 23 km south of the city of Thrissur and about 7 km north of Chalakudy. 

Perambra is well known for St.Sebastian's feast and St. Antony's feast. The St.Sebastian's feast is celebrated on January 29 &30 every year. It's a big feast were a lot of people come and celebrate.St.Antony's feast is celebrated during June every year .

Location

Government and industry

Administratively, Perambra is part of the  Kodakara panchayat and the chalakudy taluk. Apollo Tyres has a factory in Perambra.
It is an agricultural area, although Apollo Tyres is a major employer. Perambra has many rubber estates, nutmeg and rice farms, coconut plantations, cashew nut and pepper farms. Many residents work abroad in Dubai, Saudi Arabia, the UK, and the United States.

Travel
The nearest railway stations are at Chalakudy and Irinjalakuda, both located 7 km from the town. Although Perambra is considered a single block with 1,600 families, NH-544 cuts it into two pieces and there is a need for an underpass at Perambra Junction.

Religion and infrastructure

St.Antony's Church is a pilgrimage center in Perambra. The church's history in the town dates back to 1820, when a chapel was dedicated to St. Anthony of Padua as part of the Chalakudy parish for Sunday mass. In 1830 a church was built, and in 1832 it became an independent parish.

CYM (Catholic Youth Movement) is a youth wing of the Perambra parish. The KCYM (Kerala CYM) has about 100 active members, and celebrated its Silver Jubilee in 2010. CYM is involved in blood donation, eye donation, a public library and other social-welfare activities. Perambra was declared a complete blood literacy village on 29 December 2005, when all 8,000 residents had been tested for their blood groups. Perambra was the third village to achieve blood literacy in Kerala, thanks to the CYM initiative.

Puthukkavu Temple, one of the oldest Bagavathy temples, is located in Perambra. Thaalapoli maholsavam is celebrated every year on the tenth day of Makaram, featuring nine elephants.

The Government Ayurveda Hospital Perambra, established in the 1940s, moved to Perambra in 1960. This hospital is one of the three government ayurveda hospitals in Kerala where Panchakarma treatment is available.

Perambra is the birthplace of Member of Parliament Lonappan Nambadan, a former teacher and leading figure in the Communist Party who was MP from Mukundapuram from 2004–2009.

Education

Schools 
St. Antonys UP School, Perambra  
St. LIOBA ACADEMY School, Perambra
Saraswathy Vidyanikethan Senior Secondary School, Perambra
 Heal autism center [ special education school in Kerala]

See also
Apollo Tyres

References

External links
  Images from Perambra
 CYM Eye Donation Blog
 St. Antonys Church

Cities and towns in Thrissur district